Floyd Newman (born August 17, 1931) is a saxophonist, session musician and bandleader. As a baritone sax player, he was long associated with Stax Records, and as a member of The Mar-Keys’ horn section and the Memphis Horns.

Born in Memphis, in the late 1940s he became a member of the B.B. King Review, with, among others, George Coleman and George Joyner. Newman later moved to Detroit and recorded with Jackie Brenston, and toured with Sam Cooke before returning to Memphis. Newman also led a band featuring Howard Grimes on drums, Joe Woods on guitar and Isaac Hayes on keyboards, and which performed at the Plantation Inn. This line-up also recorded a 45, “Frog Stomp”, co-written by Newman and Hayes. Newman and Hayes had previously coincided in Ben Branch’s house band at the Tropicana Club, with Hayes as a vocalist.

As a member of the House horn section at Stax, in 1965 he would go on to become a founding member of the Memphis Horns, with Wayne Jackson and Gene "Bowlegs" Miller on trumpets, Floyd Newman on baritone sax and Andrew Love on tenor.

Discography
As leader/co-leader
1963: "Frog Stomp" / "Sassy" (Stax)

As sideman
1964: Pain in My Heart – Otis Redding
1965: Boss of the Blues – B.B. King
1965: The Great Otis Redding Sings Soul Ballads – Otis Redding
1965: Otis Blue: Otis Redding Sings Soul – Otis Redding
1965: In the Midnight Hour – Wilson Pickett
1966: The Exciting Wilson Pickett – Wilson Pickett
1966: Complete & Unbelievable: The Otis Redding Dictionary of Soul – Otis Redding
1966: The Soul Album – Otis Redding
1967: The Sound of Wilson Pickett – Wilson Pickett
1967: The Wicked Pickett – Wilson Pickett
1968: Tell Mama – Etta James
1968: I'm in Love – Wilson Pickett
1968: The Dock of the Bay – Otis Redding
1968: Aretha Now – Aretha Franklin
1969: Boz Scaggs – Boz Scaggs
1970: Melody Fair – Lulu
1971: Stephen Stills 2 – Stephen Stills
1973: Hey Now Hey (The Other Side of the Sky) – Aretha Franklin

References

External links
Floyd Newman NAMM Oral History Interview (2015)

1940s births
Living people
Musicians from Memphis, Tennessee
African-American saxophonists
American soul musicians
American male saxophonists
Atlantic Records artists
Stax Records artists
21st-century American saxophonists
21st-century American male musicians